John Kenneth Dust (born John Kenneth Dunkin: November 30, 1972), better known by the stage name Pigeon John, is an American rapper based in Los Angeles, California. He is a former member of L.A. Symphony.

Early life
Pigeon John claims that his stage name was provided by Jesus who was driving around Inglewood: "He hopped out and handed me a dead pigeon. He whispered, 'Please have a good time, you're really bumming me out.' I watched him sink back into the cushioned seats and drive, quickly away. And that's when it happened, the pigeon started shaking violently and became awake, picked up and flew away. I don't think I had a choice... it was 'pigeon' or die." He later explained that he was discussing his need for a stage name with a friend when the friend suggested "Chicken John", taken from the character Chicken George in Roots. The friend's mother then interjected that John didn't look like a chicken, claiming that he looked like a pigeon and should therefore be called "Pigeon John".

Career
In the early 1990s, Pigeon John and his childhood friend B-Twice formed the hip-hop duo Brainwash Projects. Brainwash Projects contributed the single "Muchas Muchachas" to the Christian rap compilation "Sanktifunctafyd" released by N-Soul Records in 1995. Brainwash Projects eventually released a record titled The Rise and Fall of Brainwash Projects on the independent label Jackson Rubio. One reviewer characterized The Rise and Fall as "pure, uncut, holy hip-hop" but gave mixed reviews of its beats and lyrics.

Between 1997 and 2000, Pigeon John recorded the songs that became his first solo album, Is Clueless. The album was released in 2001 by The Telephone Company and then re-released in 2002 by The Telephone Company/Syntax Records with three new tracks and new artwork. Pigeon John then signed to Basement Records and released Is Dating Your Sister (2003) and Pigeon John Sings the Blues (2005). In 2005, Lyrics Born saw Pigeon John on the Cali Comm Tour and brought him into Quannum Projects. That same year, Pigeon John's single "Deception" was featured on a series of Nestle Crunch commercials. In 2006, after signing to Quannum, Pigeon John released his fourth solo album, And the Summertime Pool Party. The album has received positive reviews from many sources, including LA Weekly, Entertainment Weekly, and Vibe.

A new album, entitled Dragon Slayer, hit physical and digital retail October 12, 2010.  With the aid of General Elektriks' Herve Salters, he produced the whole record, including, for the first time, sampling original instrumentation rather than flipping samples from records. A single from the album, The Bomb, was used to promote the premiere of the Cartoon Network live-action TV film Level Up in late 2011. In 2014, he released an album titled Encino Man.

In 2019, he released "They Don't Make Em Like Me" as a single. The song was included in the official Motorola Razr advertisement. On April 24, 2020, he released his eighth studio album: Gotta Good Feelin.

Personal life
John was married to Harmony Dust from 2002 to 2010.

Discography

Studio albums
 Is Clueless (2001)
 Is Dating Your Sister (2003)
 Sings the Blues (2005)
 And the Summertime Pool Party (2006)
 Dragon Slayer (2010)
 Encino Man (2014)
 Good Sinner (2016)
 Rap Record (2017)
 Gold (2017) (with Flynn, as Rootbeer)
 Gotta Good Feelin''' (2020)

Compilation albums
 Featuring Pigeon John (2004)
 Featuring Pigeon John 2 (2007)

EPs
 Pink Limousine (2009) (with Flynn, as Rootbeer)
 18 Minutes (2014) (with Flynn, as Rootbeer)
 The Rebound (2014) (with Alpha MC)

Singles
 "Life Goes On" (2003)
 "Originalz" (2003)
 "Is Clueless" (2003)
 "Nothing Without You" b/w "Sleeping Giants" (2004)
 "The Bomb" (2011)
 "Champagne on My Shoes" (2014)

Guest appearances
 Freedom of Soul - "Not This Record" from The Second Comin (1993)
 LPG - "Judge Not" from The Earth Worm (1995)
 Flynn - "Spanish Harlem" from Louder (1998)
 Flipside - "Sunny Days" (1999)
 Knowdaverbs - "Call of the Dung Beetle" from The Syllabus (1999)
 MG! The Visionary - "Scared As..." from Transparemcee (2000)
 PAX217 - "Gratitude" from Twoseventeen (2000)
 Soul-Junk - "Sea Monsters and Gargoyles" from  1956 (2000)
 .rod laver - "All Around America" from Trying Not to Try (2000)
 Murs - "The Two Step" (2000)
 4th Avenue Jones - "Truth or Dare" from No Plan B (2000)
 DJ Maj - "Golden Motorcycle" from Wax Museum: the Mixtape (2000)
 DJ Maj - "Deception" from Full Plates: Mixtape 002 (2001)
 Flynn - "Endless Maze" from Burnt Out (2001)
 Royal Ruckus - "Pocket Lint", "Jon&Stacie", "A Las Chicas", "Easily Forgotten" and "Let's Start a Boy Band" from Pocket Lint & Spare Change (2001)
 Tapwater - "Debris", "Passion" and "The White Man" from Two Forty Five (2001)
 Red Cloud - "The Pigeon John Song" from Is This Thing On? (2002)
 Sharlok Poems - "Driven by Facts" from Left (2002)
 KJ-52 - "Revenge of the Nerds" from Collaborations (2002)
 Future Shock - "Paperweights" from The Art of Xenos: Entertaining Aliens (2002)
 DJ Maj - "God Music" from The Ringleader: Mixtape Volume III (2003)
 4th Avenue Jones - "U Rockin'" from Hiprocksoul (2003)
 The Grouch & Eligh - "No More Greener Grass" from No More Greener Grasses (2003)
 Adventure Time - "Whetting Whistles" from Dreams of Water Themes (2003)
 Crankcase - "The Next Big Thing" (2003)
 Luke Geraty - "Brandon's Folly" and "Pandemonium" from It's Cold Out Here (2003)
 Mars Ill - "Planes and Trains" from Backbreakanomics (2003)
 Kiz Charizmatic - "The Hype, The Hustle" from Rawthentic (2003)
 Sup the Chemist - "Reaching" from Eargasmic Arrangements (2003)
 Joey the Jerk - "Same Dark Sweater" from Average Joe (2004)
 KJ-52 - "All Around the World" from 7th Avenue (2004)
 .rod laver - "The Official Pigeon John Guest Appearance" from The Dialogue: Rudolph Wayne Vs. The Man (2004)
 Shape Shifters - "Little Life" from Was Here (2004)
 Neila - "Rules" from For Whom the Bells Crow (2004)
 Braille - "It Won't Last" from Shades of Grey (2004)
 Fat Jack - "Pay Back" from Cater to the DJ Vol. 2 (2004)
 Apsci - "Stompin'" from Thanks for Asking (2005)
 Blackalicious - "Side to Side" from The Craft (2005)
 Bobby Bishop - "Show Love" from Government Name (2005)
 Cheap Cologne - "Barry Manilow Is Alive and Well" from Something Random (2005)
 Opio - "Granite Earth" from Triangulation Station (2005)
 Project Blowed - "The People" from 10th Anniversary (2005)
 Othello - "Shallow" from Alive at the Assembly Line (2006)
 JRemy - "You Don't Know Me" from Backwoods Legend (2006)
 Lightheaded - "Surprise Cypher" from Wrong Way (2006)
 KJ-52 - "Revenge of the Nerds (Horns A Plenty Remix)" from Remixed (2006)
 Lyrics Born - "I'm Just Raw (remix)" from Overnite Encore: Lyrics Born Live! (2006)
 Wordburglar - "Breeze" from Burglaritis (2006)
 Mils - "Upside Down" from The And Album (2006)
 Cookbook & Uno Mas - "Take Control" from While They Slept (2006)
 Daedelus - "Something Bells" from Something Bells EP (2006)
 4th Avenue Jones - "Zoom" from Hip Hope Hits 2006 (2006)
 Acid Reign - "Never Fold" from Time and Change (2006)
 GRITS - "Open Bar" and "You Said" from Redemption (2006)
 Grayskul - "Dance the Frantic" from Bloody Radio (2007)
 Heath McNease - "Love Me" from The Heath McNease Fan Club Meets Tonight (2007)
 Toca - "Liar" and "Hearts and Gold" from Toca (2007)
 DJ Stibs - "WildNights" from ...And I Love Her (2007)
 Mr. J. Medeiros - "Money" from Of Gods and Girls (2007)
 Hi-Fidel & DJ Crucial - "Small Victories" from FF Express: The Company of Wolves (2007)
 Kruse - "Daydreaming" from True Stories (2007)
 Mr. J. Medieros - "Money" from Of Gods and Girls (2007)
 Redcloud - "Death of a Salesman" and "Tapatio" from Hawthorne's Most Wanted (2007)
 The Remnant - "Catch Your Breath" and "The Salute" from PB&J: Players, Babes and Jesus (2008)
 Josh Martinez - "Beerhunger Lovestory" from The World Famous Sex Buffet (2008)
 Yoni - "Fly" from End of an Era (2008)
 The Gigantics - "Memory Loss" from Die Already (2008)
 GRITS - "Beautiful Morning" from Reiterate (2008)
 General Elektriks - "Crush" (2009)
 Peter Daily - "Bright Lights Remix" from The 9th. Street Sessions EP (2009)
 Scout Da Psalmist - "Change Is Gonna Come" from Emceeing Again (2009)
 Soulico - "S.O.S." from Exotic on the Speaker (2009)
 The Grouch & Eligh - "All In" from Say G&E! (2009)
 Eligh & Jo Wilkinson - "Honor Me" and "Safe" from On Sacred Ground: Mother & Son (2009)
 Sapient - "Shoot for the Ground" from Barrels for Feathers (2010)
 Factor - "They Don't Know" from Lawson Graham (2010)
 Eligh - "Whirlwind" from Grey Crow (2010)
 Heath McNease - "American Idle" from The Gun Show (2010)
 CookBook & UNO Mas - "Where Ya Been All My Life" from C&U Music Factory (2010)
 C2C - "Because of You" from Tetra (2012)
 Chantal Claret - "Light It Up" from The One, The Only... (2012)
 RationaL - "Dream On" from The BirthWrite LP (2012)
 Dumbfoundead - "Freedumb" from Old Boy Jon (2013)
 Blu & Cookbook - "Popeye" from Yes (2013)
 Sleep - "Truth Serum" from Oregon Failure (2014)
 The Grouch & Eligh - "Run" from The Tortoise and the Crow (2014)
 Abstract Rude - "Relay" from Keep the Feel: A Legacy of Hip Hop Soul (2015)
 Royal Ruckus - "Coulda Swore I Saw You" from The Summer of the Cicadas'' (2017)

References

External links
 
 

1972 births
Living people
Quannum Projects artists
American performers of Christian hip hop music
Midwest hip hop musicians
Musicians from Omaha, Nebraska
Rappers from Nebraska
Musicians from Hawthorne, California
21st-century American rappers
Project Blowed